Johannes "Hans" van Leeuwen (born 1946 in Gouda, South Holland) is educator, engineer, inventor, researcher, and entrepreneur. He is an emeritus professor of Civil, Construction and Environmental Engineering at Iowa State University and an entrepreneur in ethanol co-product development. His research and innovations have worked to solve various problems including, new water purification methods, a way of creating food and animal feed from waste, and a process in making the purest alcohol ever made.

Early life and education
van Leeuwen was born in 1946 in Gouda, South Holland, Netherlands. He grew up in South Africa. His experience growing up in South Africa helped him emotionally connect with the underprivileged living in developing countries and inspired his later work. He studied at University of Pretoria in South Africa and received all his degrees from the same school, including his B.S. in 1975 in Chemical Engineering, his M.S. in 1979 in Engineering and Water Utilization, a Graduate Diploma of Tertiary Education in 1983 and a Doctorate in Environmental Engineering in 1988.

Research
van Leeuwen's early research was focused on water reclamation from wastewater. His research included the recovery of byproducts from liquid wastes and sediments, fungal treatment of food processing wastewater, and reuse applications of residues from water softening. He has several patents to his name. He was able to extend the life of activated carbon at least 7 times by using a microbial process. As of 2009, this process was being used at the Goreangab Walter Reclamation Plant in Windhoek, Khomas Region, Namibia and at the South Caboolture Water Reclamation plant in Caboolture, Queensland, Australia.

He worked on a ships ballast water treatment project with Darren Oemcke, Jake Perrins and  Bill Cooper of the University of California, Irvine; and Russ Herwig of the University of Washington, Seattle. They were attempting to keeping exotic species (such as zebra mussels) out of coastal waters through the disinfestation of ballast water with bromine production through rapid ozonation to avoid spreading feral species. As of 2009, this innovation is now being used on international tankers.

Van Leeuwen's MycoMax process works by cultivating microbial filamentous fungi on leftovers from ethanol fermentation and distillation in order to create a high quality animal feed. Growing fungus on the leftover corn found in ethanol production, provides for good energy feed for livestock animals (such as pigs and chickens), but can also reduce energy costs. More importantly, the fungal biomass can serve as a source of valuable biochemicals, such as chitin, amino acids and bio-oils. Chitin, in turn, can be converted to chitosan and glucosamine, both valuable chemicals used in medicine, agriculture and water treatment.

Van Leeuwen's Mycofuel process is a two-stage bioconversion process in order to create bio-oil or biofuel from various scrapped plant matter. This process could be a more sustainable and cost-effective alternative process to making ethanol from various plant materials, This was work done in collaboration at Iowa State University with various colleagues and graduate students.

His physical-chemical alcohol purification process has found application in the production of an impurity-free vodka in Iowa, IngeniOz.

Teaching 
He is an emeritus professor in the Department of Civil, Construction and Environmental Engineering at Iowa State University (ISU) in Ames, Iowa. He started as a professor at ISU in 2000. Together with professor Balaji Narasimhan, he was given a Vlasta Klima Balloun Professorship at Iowa State University in 2010. Previously he had been a professor at the University of New England, Australia, Griffith University, Australia, and the University of Pretoria.

Awards and honors 
 2007 – Ethanol purification with ozonation and activated carbon, Grand Prize University Research, American Academy of Environmental Engineers
2008 – MycoMax fungal process for additional ethanol plant coproduct, R&D 100 Awards, R&D Magazine
2008 – Fungal process for ethanol plant stillage beneficiation, Grand Prize University Research, American Academy of Environmental Engineers
2009 – Bio-oil from an integrated fungal lignocellulosic biorefinery, Grand Prize University Research, American Academy of Environmental Engineers
2009 – Innovator of the Year, R&D Magazine  
2009 – Award for Outstanding Achievement in Research, Iowa State University, Ames, Iowa
2009 – Mycofuel fungal process for biodiesel from processing wastes, R&D 100 Awards, R&D Magazine
2011 – Honor Award, Fungal pilot plant for animal feed production, Grand Prize University Research, American Academy of Environmental Engineers
2012 – Global Grand Prize for Project Innovation Awards in Applied Research, International Water Association (IWA)

References  

1946 births
Living people
American bioengineers
Leeuwen, Hans van
Iowa State University faculty
Leeuwen, Hans van
University of Pretoria alumni